Longxi Township is a rural township in Yanling County, Hunan Province, People's Republic of China.

Cityscape
The township is divided into 14 villages, the following areas: Caoxi Village, Jiangzhou Village, Sankoulong Village, Xikeng Village, Tulei Village, Chabei Village, Nan'an Village, Gutang Village, Niutang Village, Xianping Village, Chalong Village, Qiutian Village, Banxi Village, and Caiping Village.

References

External links

Divisions of Yanling County